Reveille Park is the eighth solo studio album by American hip hop recording artist SPM. It was released on Dope House Records in 2002 shortly after SPM was incarcerated for statutory rape. Most of the tracks on this album are freestyle rapping. There was a "Chopped & Screwed" version of the album released on August 26, 2002. Coy stated that the entire album was recorded in two days. It was recorded at his house by his long-time friend and record producer Filero, who also added to the production of the album. It was mixed and mastered by James Hoover at Digital Services in Houston, Texas.

Track listing

Chart history

References

External links

2002 albums
South Park Mexican albums